Ian Lonergan (born July 16, 1999) is an American college soccer player who plays as a defender for the University of California, Berkeley.

Career

College
Ahead of the 2018 NCAA Division I men's soccer season, Longergan signed a National Letter of Intent to play for the University of California, Berkeley men's soccer program. During his freshman year he became an immediate starter, making his college soccer debut and start on August 24, 2018 against Detroit Mercy.

Professional
After been with the LA Galaxy academy since playing with their U-14 side, Lonergan appeared for United Soccer League club LA Galaxy II as an amateur player.

References

External links
 

1999 births
Living people
American soccer players
LA Galaxy II players
California Golden Bears men's soccer players
Association football defenders
Soccer players from California
USL Championship players